This is a list of members of the 39th Legislative Assembly of Queensland from 1969 to 1972, as elected at the 1969 state election held on 17 May 1969.

 On 26 December 1969, Country member for Albert, Cec Carey, died. Liberal candidate Bill Heatley won the resulting by-election on 14 February 1970.
 On 4 June 1971, Labor member for Maryborough, Horace Davies, died. Liberal candidate Gilbert Alison won the resulting by-election on 24 July 1971.
 On 30 June 1971, Liberal member for Merthyr, Sam Ramsden, resigned. Liberal candidate Don Lane won the resulting by-election on 24 July 1971.
 On 29 October 1971, Liberal member for Albert, Bill Heatley, died. No by-election was called because of the proximity of the 1972 election.
 On 30 October 1971, Country member for Callide, Vince Jones, died. No by-election was called because of the proximity of the 1972 election.
 South Brisbane MP Col Bennett, Mackay MP Ed Casey and Rockhampton North MP Merv Thackeray lost Labor preselection in January 1972 for that year's election. Casey resigned from the party in February 1972 and would be re-elected as an independent, while Bennett and Thackeray were subsequently expelled from the party when they also challenged the endorsed Labor candidates as independents.

See also
1969 Queensland state election
Premier: Joh Bjelke-Petersen (National Party) (1968–1987)
 Members of the Queensland Legislative Assembly

References

 

Members of Queensland parliaments by term
20th-century Australian politicians